Børge Mørk (born 19 August 1971) is a Norwegian breaststroke swimmer. He was born in Narvik. He competed at the 1992 Summer Olympics in Barcelona, and at the 1996 Summer Olympics in Atlanta. He won a total of 38 gold medals at the Norwegian championships.

References

External links

1971 births
Living people
People from Narvik
Norwegian male breaststroke swimmers
Olympic swimmers of Norway
Swimmers at the 1992 Summer Olympics
Swimmers at the 1996 Summer Olympics
Sportspeople from Nordland
20th-century Norwegian people